The Mahoning River is a river located in northeastern Ohio and a small portion of western Pennsylvania. Flowing primarily through several Ohio counties, it crosses the state line into Pennsylvania before joining with the Shenango River to form the Beaver River. It is part of the Ohio River watershed. The name is said to derive from either the Lenape or Shawnee languages and mean "Deer Lick," as the area was once known for salt springs, but it's possible the name of the Mahoning and several other similarly named landmarks and places in western Pennsylvania (Manayunk, etc) could come from the Lenape, mënehokink (may-nuh-ho-keeng), meaning "place to get water."

Tributaries

North Shore
 Marshall Run
 Grays Run
 Dry Run
 Little Squaw Creek
 Mosquito Creek
 Chocolate Run
 Eagle Creek
 West Branch
 Kale Creek
 Willow Creek
 Deer Creek
 Beech Creek
 Beaver Run

South Shore
 Hickory Run
 Hines Run
 Yellow Creek
 Mill Creek (Austintown)
 Fourmile Run
 Meander Creek
 Mud Creek
 Duck Creek
 Lawson Run
 Charley Run Creek
 Mill Creek (Berlin)
 Island Creek
 Fish Creek

Hydronymy 
The name comes from Lenape , meaning "at the licks" or "there is a lick", referring to historic salt licks in the area.

Physical properties 

The river is formed near Winona in Columbiana County, Ohio, and extends for a length of approximately 113 miles (182 km), with a watershed area of approximately 1,132 square miles (2,932 km²). It joins the Shenango River near Mahoningtown, Pennsylvania south of New Castle to form the Beaver River.  The river traverses five Ohio counties, Columbiana, Stark, Portage, Trumbull, and Mahoning, as well as Lawrence County, Pennsylvania.  The watershed area also includes parts of Ashtabula and Geauga counties in Ohio.

The three main tributaries are Mosquito Creek, West Branch, and Eagle Creek, all in Ohio. There are 15 dams on the river course.  The river has a course of 97.1 miles (156.3 km) in Ohio, with the remainder in Pennsylvania.

The river supports more than 72 species of fish and 15 species of freshwater mussels.

The river is roughly divided into two sections based on its own character and its surroundings. In addition to the change in terrain address in the section on "Floods", the level of human development changes dramatically as well.  The “upper elevation” flowing north and east extends roughly from Winona to Leavittsburg and is generally rural in nature, meandering through game lands, forests, and agricultural properties.  The mainstem (lower elevation) flowing mainly southeast extends roughly from Leavittsburg to the river's mouth near New Castle, Pennsylvania. Portions of this section are more densely populated and heavily industrialized, including the cities of Warren, Niles, Youngstown, Campbell, and others. The area suffers with residue from all the industrial activity that began in the late 19th century. The mainstem area has a population of over 500,000 and has a long history of steel making, coke production, and other industries.

Environmental concerns 

The industrial nature of the mainstem area has caused considerable pollution in the river.  Much of the pollution has left the ecosystem via the natural river flow. But analysts estimate that 750,000 cubic yards (573,416 m³) of river bed and shoreline sediment, over a 30-mile (48.2 km) stretch of the mainstem from Leavittsburg to the Pennsylvania border, is so heavily polluted that it will need to be remediated.  Approximately 45% of this material is located in the vicinity of the Girard Dam near Girard, Ohio, which has acted as a trap for much of the contaminated sediment.

Petroleum hydrocarbons, benzo(a)pyrene (polycyclic aromatic hydrocarbons), and mercury have all been found in quantities several times the maximum safe levels.  Since 1988, the Ohio Department of Health has maintained an advisory against swimming or wading in the river between Leavittsburg and the Pennsylvania border, and also advises against eating fish caught there. The Corps of Engineers estimates that the remediation will take up to 15 years to complete and cost in excess of US$100 million.

Cities and towns along its course include:

 Winona, Ohio
 Alliance, Ohio
 Sebring, Ohio
 Newton Falls, Ohio
 Leavittsburg, Ohio
 Warren, Ohio
 Niles, Ohio
 McDonald, Ohio
 Girard, Ohio
 Youngstown, Ohio
 Campbell, Ohio
 Struthers, Ohio
 Lowellville, Ohio
 Edinburg, Pennsylvania
 Mahoningtown, Pennsylvania

Floods 
The Mahoning river is susceptible to frequent flooding during high rain events. A days long flood lasted almost continuously from March 23 to March 26, 1913. Youngstown residents were without water. Damage reached to communities throughout the area, such as Leavittsburg and Lowellville. Losses to the busy industrial area in the region reached the millions of dollars. Flood waters nearly reached the roofs of Republic Steel's plant. Some damaged bridges collapsed. Several water control infrastructure projects followed: The Lake Milton dam was built from 1913 to 1917.

Another dramatic flooding event started when three days of torrential rain fell in July 2003, resulting in such high volume that the river changed its course in Leavittsburg, flooding and destroying nearly 100 homes. For much of the upper half of the river, the land is relatively flat with minimal relief to confine the river. This makes it prone to change courses during high-water events. Around Youngstown, the river valley becomes much more pronounced and the river is more constrained, although there is still room for localized avulsions.

See also
 List of rivers of Ohio
 List of rivers of Pennsylvania
 Mahoning Valley

References

External links
 Archived version of Youngstown State University's Mahoning River Watershed website
 Archived version of Mahoning River Consortium website

Rivers of Ohio
Rivers of Pennsylvania
Tributaries of the Beaver River
Youngstown, Ohio
Rivers of Clearfield County, Pennsylvania
Rivers of Lawrence County, Pennsylvania
Rivers of Mahoning County, Ohio
Rivers of Columbiana County, Ohio
Rivers of Stark County, Ohio
Rivers of Portage County, Ohio
Rivers of Trumbull County, Ohio